Parmotrema alidactylatum is a species of saxicolous lichen in the family Parmeliaceae. Found in Argentina, it was described as new to science in 1998. The holotype was collected in Cerro Colorado in northern Córdoba Province, where it was found growing on granite. The specific epithet alidactylatum refers to the presence of aliphatic acids in the medulla and the dactylate (referring to finger-like processes) upper surface. Parmotrema alidactylatum is similar in appearance and morphology to P. tsavoënse, but has different medullary chemistry.

See also
List of Parmotrema species

References

alidactylatum
Lichen species
Lichens described in 1998
Lichens of Argentina